The Morung Express is an English language newspaper published from Dimapur in Nagaland, India. It was the first print newspaper in Nagaland with an online edition.

The Morung Express is a daily with 12 pages on most days. There are supplements on Friday (Ad Bazaar) and Saturday (Impressions). Ad Bazaar on Friday is an 8-page quarter fold supplement containing classified ads, including a page of free personal ads. Impressions on Saturday is a 4-page supplement containing information and news on topics including Public Agenda, EduCare, Science and Technology, Youths, Art and Living; and People-Photo Speak.

The newspaper is targeted at the age group of 25–45 years. Its readership is concentrated in cities and towns such as Kohima, Chümoukedima, Dimapur and Mokokchung.

See also
List of newspapers in Nagaland

References

External links 
Official website
The Morung Express on Instagram

Newspapers published in Nagaland
English-language newspapers published in India
Mass media in Nagaland
2005 establishments in Nagaland
Publications established in 2005
Dimapur